Moskovsky 2-y is a rural locality (a settlement) in Novopokrovskoye Rural Settlement, Novokhopyorsky District, Voronezh Oblast, Russia. The population was 58 as of 2010. There are 2 streets.

Geography 
Moskovsky 2-y is located 47 km northwest of Novokhopyorsk (the district's administrative centre) by road. Leninsky is the nearest rural locality.

References 

Populated places in Novokhopyorsky District